Sarangesa purendra, commonly known as the spotted small flat, is a species of butterfly in the family Hesperiidae.

Subspecies
Sarangesa purendra purendra Moore, 1882 - Himachal Pradesh to Uttarakhand
Sarangesa purendra hopkinsi Evans, 1921 - Karnataka and Tamil Nadu
Sarangesa purendra pandra Evans, 1949 - Kerala to Rajasthan
Sarangesa purendra sati de Nicéville, 1891 - Gujarat (Kutch)

Description
In 1865, Frederic Moore described this butterfly as:

Life history
The larvae of Sarangesa purendra hopkinsi feed on Asystasia and Blepharis asperrima. They also feed on Lepidagathis cristata but need confirmation. Whereas the Sarangesa purendra pandra feed on Lepidagathis keralensis.

References

Celaenorrhinini
Butterflies of Asia
Butterflies described in 1882
Taxa named by Frederic Moore